Changchun–Jilin intercity railway is a high-speed rail line operated by China Railway High-speed in Jilin Province, which opened for service on January 11, 2011. It is the first intercity high-speed rail to be operational in Northeast China. Like the Shanghai–Nanjing intercity high-speed railway, which services Shanghai Hongqiao International Airport, the Changchun–Jilin intercity railway serves as an airport rail link for the cities of Changchun and Jilin.

Summary

The line connects, and terminates at, the cities of Changchun and Jilin. The entire line spans  and was built at a cost of RMB 9.6 billion. Construction began on May 13, 2007, and the line was officially open to the public on January 11, 2011. The line also services Changchun Longjia International Airport with Longjia railway station, which is nine minutes from Changchun station and 22 minutes from Jilin station.

At Jilin, the line continues as the Jilin–Hunchun intercity railway, terminating at Hunchun railway station.

Stations
The railway has seven stations, of which three are operational, two are scheduled to be operational and two are reserved for future operations. The stations are:

Ticketing
All operational stations have both staffed ticket booths and ticket vending machines. , the ticket vending machines can only accept cash (fourth and fifth series renminbi banknotes in denominations ¥5, ¥10, ¥20, ¥50 and ¥100 only, no coins) as payment.

References

Rail transport in Jilin
Transport in Changchun
Jilin City
Railway lines opened in 2011
Airport rail links in China
High-speed railway lines in China